Muğancıq Mehrab (also Mughanjyg Mehrab) is a municipality and village in the Sharur District of Nakhchivan, Azerbaijan. It is located in the near of the Nakhchivan-Sadarak highway, 1.5 km away from the district center, on the plain. Its population is busy with beet-growing, vegetable-growing and farming. There is a secondary school, a library, a club and a medical center in the village. It has a population of 623.

Etymology
Place of residence was formed as a result of the settling the families belonging to the Iranian Mugh مغ (Magi) priestly tribe under the leadership of the person named Mehrab مهراب. The mughanjyg means "small Magi, a small portion of Magi".

References

Populated places in Sharur District